Kepler Communications Inc. is a private telecommunications company based in Toronto, Ontario, Canada.  The company's stated mission is to deliver affordable network connectivity across the globe via a growing network of small satellites.

Overview
Kepler Communications is working to build a constellation of small, shoebox-sized satellites based on the CubeSat standard to deliver connectivity to other satellites and ground-based stations, allowing for near real-time exchange of data from IoT devices, large scale data backhaul (store-and-forward) services, and ultimately command and control for other space-based assets.

The company hopes to grow their business around data backhaul services that will serve remote business operators, shippers, research stations, and entities engaged in resource exploration and gathering (mining, oil and gas) in remote locations.  Their units are capable of high-bandwidth transfer, allowing them to move data that is too cumbersome for existing real-time satellite communications systems.

Additionally, Kepler is working to establish, using the same platform of satellites, an Internet of Things (IoT) communication system that will ease the problems caused by a global disparity between established communications methods and protocols across regions (no antenna currently exists which can communicate across all existing cellular networks).  This solution is designed to be a low-power, low-bandwidth, and low-cost connectivity platforms for IoT devices around the globe.

Kepler's key technology is a high-capacity, high-throughput software-defined radio (SDR) that can provide 200 MHz of bandwidth, allowing for data throughput of 500 megabits/second (Mbps) in communication speed.

All of Kepler's satellites to date have been built by ÅAC Clyde, a company based in Glasgow, Scotland that specializes in CubeSat and SmallSat production.

Kepler Communications was founded in 2015 by four graduate students from the University of Toronto, who previously worked together on various design projects through the University of Toronto Aerospace Team. The startup was incubated at University of Toronto's Entrepreneurship Hatchery, the Creative Destruction Lab, Ryerson University's DMZ, and was part of the Techstars Seattle 2016 cohort. Kepler was able to raise $5M in a seed round financing at Techstars, and in the span of 12 months was able to take KIPP from design to orbit. In 2018, the company successfully completed their Series A financing round, raising a total of $16M USD. The round was led by Costanoa Ventures, with participation by Deutsche Bahn’s (DB) Digital Ventures as a strategic investor.

The company is named in honour of Johannes Kepler, a pioneer in the discovery of the way in which objects in space interact.  He is best known for his Laws of Planetary Motion.

Satellites launched 
Kepler has successfully launched three 3U CubeSat technology demonstrator satellites, whose names (KIPP, CASE, and TARS) are taken from the fictitious US Marine Corps robots of the same name in the 2014 film “Interstellar”, and has since launched 16 operational satellites as of January 2022. Company officials have stated a goal of growing their constellation up to 140 units, all located in Sun-Synchronous polar orbits, approximately 575 km above the Earth's surface.

References

Canadian companies established in 2015
Companies based in Toronto
Telecommunications companies of Canada
Telecommunications companies established in 2015